William Lee Gullickson (born February 20, 1959) is an American former Major League Baseball pitcher who played professionally in Canada, the U.S. and Japan, during an 18-year professional career, of which 14 seasons were spent in MLB.

MLB career (1979–1987)

Minor Leagues

Gullickson was selected as the second player to be drafted in the first round of the June 1977 Major League Baseball draft by the Montreal Expos, out of Joliet Catholic Academy in Joliet, Illinois.

Montreal Expos

In , he helped the Expos to their only division title with a 7–9, 2.81 record. The Expos lost the National League Championship Series to the Los Angeles Dodgers in five games. Except for the 1981 strike season, Gullickson was in double figures in wins for every year onward.

Cincinnati Reds

On December 12, 1985, Gullickson was acquired by the Reds, along with catcher Sal Butera; the Reds sent pitchers Andy McGaffigan and John Stuper and catcher Dann Bilardello to the Expos. Gullickson was 15-12 for the Reds with an ERA of 3.38  Gullickson was 10-11 when he was traded mid-season to the New York Yankees in 1987 .

New York Yankees

On August 26, 1987, Gullickson was acquired by the New York Yankees who sent Dennis Rasmussen to the Reds.  for their  pennant drive. He recorded 4 wins and 2 losses with the Yankees but he was unhappy there. Tommy John thought the intense media coverage and high expectations of the New York fans proved difficult for Gullickson to adjust to. In 1988, he accepted a $2 million offer to pitch in Japan for the Yomiuri Giants after being granted free agency on November 9, 1987

NPB career (1988–1989)
Gullickson stayed with the Giants for two seasons, with a record of 21–14. Kazushige Nagashima, the son of Japanese baseball legend Shigeo Nagashima, got the first hit in his professional career, a home run, off Gullickson. When asked about his time in Japan, Gullickson said it was strange; the only English words that he saw were "Sony and Mitsubishi."

Overcomes diabetes to excel
Although only in Japan for a short time, Gullickson left behind a positive legacy. When he was in Japan, it was considered a miracle that Gullickson, a patient with type 1 diabetes mellitus, played a professional sport. Since 1998, the Japan Diabetes Mellitus Society (JADMC) has awarded the "Gullickson Award" for the patient who is deemed a superior influence on society.

While in Japan, Gullickson also developed a close friendship with a young Japanese pitcher, Masumi Kuwata, and even named his son "Craig Kuwata Gullickson" in his honor. Kuwata learned many things from Gullickson and grew to be one of the best players in Japan. Meanwhile, Kuwata had always wished to play in MLB, and at last, this dream was realized in 2007, as he became a member of the Pittsburgh Pirates. Nearly 20 years after meeting Gullickson, Kuwata became an MLB rookie, at the age of 39.

At the age of 12, Sam Fuld, an aspiring baseball player who also had diabetes, met Gullickson, and talked to him for two minutes. "That was enough to inspire me", Fuld said. "Any time I can talk to young diabetic kids, I look forward to that opportunity", said Gullickson.  Fuld went on to play eight seasons in the Major Leagues.

Back to MLB (1990–1994)

Houston Astros
Gullickson signed as a free agent with the Houston Astros after the 1989 season, and had a mediocre 1990 season (10–14, 3.82 ERA) before being released.

Detroit Tigers
Late in 1990, Gullickson signed a multimillion-dollar contract with the Detroit Tigers, for whom he pitched for four seasons. While with the Tigers he met a young boy, who was then 12, who also had diabetes, and talked to him for two minutes. It was future major-leaguer Sam Fuld, who battled to make the Cubs' 2008 team. "That was enough to inspire me", Fuld said. "Any time I can talk to young diabetic kids, I look forward to that opportunity."

In , Gullickson had a career-high 20 wins against 9 losses, leading the American League in wins and placing eighth in the AL Cy Young Award voting. The Tigers would not have another 20-game winner until Justin Verlander in 2011. Gullickson tallied another 14 wins in 1992, and had 13 wins in 1993. In , the 35-year old Gullickson was forced to retire due to injuries after posting a 4–5 record in 19 starts.

Family
Gullickson is married to Sandy Gullickson. Their six children are all involved in sports or other physically intensive endeavors:

 Cassie Gullickson was on the track and field team at the University of Notre Dame.
 Carly Gullickson was a professional tennis player, whose highest world ranking in singles was no. 123 and in doubles no. 52. She won the US Open Mixed Doubles in 2009. She is retired and is a stay-at-home mom.
 Chelsey Gullickson won the 2010 NCAA Division I women's singles tennis championship for the University of Georgia.
 Craig Gullickson was a standout pitcher at Cardinal Newman High School, where he was one of the best pitchers in the state of Florida. He received a scholarship to play for Clemson University after his performance in the High School All Star Game.
 Callie Gullickson is a strength instructor at Peloton. She is a former dancer and model. She attended Pace University in New York City.
 Chloe Gullickson is a tennis player and was no. 2 in Florida and highly nationally ranked. She received a full scholarship to the University of Virginia.

See also
 List of Major League Baseball annual wins leaders
 List of Major League Baseball single-game strikeout leaders

References

External links

1959 births
Living people
People from Marshall, Minnesota
American disabled sportspeople
American expatriate baseball players in Canada
American expatriate baseball players in Japan
American League wins champions
Baseball players from Illinois
Baseball players from Minnesota
Cincinnati Reds players
Denver Bears players
Detroit Tigers players
Houston Astros players
Lakeland Tigers players
Major League Baseball pitchers
Memphis Chicks players
Montreal Expos players
Nippon Professional Baseball pitchers
New York Yankees players
People with type 1 diabetes
Sportspeople from Joliet, Illinois
Toledo Mud Hens players
West Palm Beach Expos players
Yomiuri Giants players